The 1992 Toronto Argonauts finished in fourth place in the East Division with a 6–12 record and failed to make the playoffs.

Offseason

Regular season

Standings

Schedule

Awards and honours

1992 CFL All-Stars
P – Hank Ilesic, CFL All-Star
DT – Rodney Harding, CFL All-Star

References

Toronto Argonauts seasons